Emadi or Al Emadi is a surname. People with the name include:

Ali Emadi, Canadian engineer
Ali Sharif Al Emadi, Qatari economist and businessman
Hafizullah Emadi, Afghan development consultant
Kian Emadi (born 1992), British track cyclist
Mohsen Emadi (born 1976), Iranian-born poet, translator and filmmaker
Yousef Hussain Kamal Al Emadi, Qatari politician and businessman
Som Amir Emadi, British-Iranian property developer, corporate finance broker and restaurateur.